The Corus Chess Tournament 2001 was the 63rd edition of the Corus Chess Tournament. It was held in Wijk aan Zee in January 2001 and was won for the third consecutive year by Garry Kasparov.

The top nine players in the January ratings list took part, and Kasparov's victory meant he was the first player in the tournament's history to win the title three years in a row. 

{| class="wikitable" style="text-align: center;"
|+ 63rd Corus Chess Tournament, group A, 13–28 January 2001, Wijk aan Zee, Cat. XIX (2710)
! !! Player !! Rating !! 1 !! 2 !! 3 !! 4 !! 5 !! 6 !! 7 !! 8 !! 9 !! 10 !! 11 !! 12 !! 13 !! 14 !! Total !! TPR !! Place
|-
|-style="background:#ccffcc;"
| 1 || align=left| || 2849 ||  || ½ || ½ || ½ || ½ || ½ || 1 || ½ || 1 || 1 || ½ || ½ || 1 || 1 || 9 || 2839 || 1
|-
| 2 || align="left" | || 2790 || ½ ||  || ½ || ½ || ½ || ½ || ½ || ½ || ½ || ½ || 1 || 1 || 1 || 1 || 8½ || 2813 || 2
|-
| 3 || align="left" | || 2772 || ½ || ½ ||  || 1 || ½ || 0 || 1 || ½ || ½ || ½ || 1 || ½ || 1 || ½ || 8 || 2791 || 3–4
|-
| 4 || align="left" | || 2717 || ½ || ½ || 0 ||  || ½ || 1 || 1 || ½ || ½ || 1 || ½ || ½ || ½ || 1 || 8 || 2795 || 3–4
|-
| 5 || align="left" | || 2746 || ½ || ½ || ½ || ½ ||  || 1 || ½ || ½ || ½ || 0 || 1 || ½ || 1 || ½ || 7½ || 2763 || 5–7
|-
| 6 || align="left" | || 2745 || ½ || ½ || 1 || 0 || 0 ||  || ½ || 0 || ½ || 1 || 1 || 1 || 1 || ½ || 7½ || 2763 || 5–7
|-
| 7 || align="left" | || 2718 || 0 || ½ || 0 || 0 || ½ || ½ ||  || ½ || 1 || ½ || 1 || 1 || 1 || 1 || 7½ || 2765 || 5–7
|-
| 8 || align="left" | || 2745 || ½ || ½ || ½ || ½ || ½ || 1 || ½ ||  || ½ || ½ || 0 || ½ || ½ || ½ || 6½ || 2706 || 8
|-
| 9 || align="left" | || 2718 || 0 || ½ || ½ || ½ || ½ || ½ || 0 || ½ ||  || ½ || ½ || 1 || ½ || 0 || 5½ || 2651 || 9
|-
| 10 || align="left" | || 2575 || 0 || ½ || ½ || 0 || 1 || 0 || ½ || ½ || ½ ||  || ½ || 0 || 0 || 1 || 5 || 2632 || 10–11
|-
| 11 || align="left" | || 2700 || ½ || 0 || 0 || ½ || 0 || 0 || 0 || 1 || ½ || ½ ||  || 1 || ½ || ½ || 5 || 2623 || 10–11
|- 
| 12 || align="left" | || 2632 || ½ || 0 || ½ || ½ || ½ || 0 || 0 || ½ || 0 || 1 || 0 ||  || ½ || ½ || 4½ || 2605 || 12–13
|-
| 13 || align="left" | || 2597 || 0 || 0 || 0 || ½ || 0 || 0 || 0 || ½ || ½ || 1 || ½ || ½ ||  || 1 || 4½ || 2608 || 12–13
|-
| 14 || align="left" | || 2629 || 0 || 0 || ½ || 0 || ½ || ½ || 0 || ½ || 1 || 0 || ½ || ½ || 0 ||  || 4 || 2574 || 14 
|}

{| class="wikitable" style="text-align: center;"
|+ 63rd Corus Chess Tournament, group B, 13–28 January 2001, Wijk aan Zee, Cat. X (2496)
! !! Player !! Rating !! 1 !! 2 !! 3 !! 4 !! 5 !! 6 !! 7 !! 8 !! 9 !! 10 !! 11 !! 12 !! Total !! TPR !! Place
|-
| 1 || align=left| || 2694 ||  || 1 || ½ || 1 || ½ || ½ || ½ || ½ || 1 || ½ || 1 || 1 || 8 || 2652 || 1
|-
| 2 || align="left" | || 2483 || 0 ||  || ½ || 1 || ½ || ½ || 0 || 1 || 1 || 1 || 1 || 1 || 7½ || 2629 || 2
|-
| 3 || align="left" | || 2544 || ½ || ½ ||  || ½ || ½ || ½ || 1 || ½ || 0 || 1 || 1 || 1 || 7 || 2593 || 3–4
|-
| 4 || align="left" | || 2578 || 0 || 0 || ½ ||  || 1 || 1 || ½ || ½ || 1 || ½ || 1 || 1 || 7 || 2590 || 3–4
|-
| 5 || align="left" | || 2514 || ½ || ½ || ½ || 0 ||  || ½ || ½ || ½ || ½ || 1 || 1 || 1 || 6½ || 2559 || 5–6
|-
| 6 || align="left" | || 2463 || ½ || ½ || ½ || 0 || ½ ||  || ½ || ½ || ½ || ½ || 1 || 1 || 6 || 2534 || 5–6
|-
| 7 || align="left" | || 2622 || ½ || 1 || 0 || ½ || ½ || ½ ||  || 1 || 0 || ½ || 0 || 1 || 5½ || 2484 || 7–8
|-
| 8 || align="left" | || 2452 || ½ || 0 || ½ || ½ || ½ || ½ || 0 ||  || 1 || 1 || 0 || 1 || 5½ || 2499 || 7–8
|-
| 9 || align="left" | || 2439 || 0 || 0 || 1 || 0 || ½ || ½ || 1 || 0 ||  || 0 || 1 || 1 || 5 || 2464 || 9
|-
| 10 || align="left" | || 2442 || ½ || 0 || 0 || ½ || 0 || ½ || ½ || 0 || 1 ||  || ½ || ½ || 4 || 2398 || 10
|-
| 11 || align="left" | || 2335 || 0 || 0 || 0 || 0 || 0 || 0 || 1 || 1 || 0 || ½ ||  || 0 || 2½ || 2299 || 11
|- 
| 12 || align="left" | || 2382 || 0 || 0 || 0 || 0 || 0 || 0 || 0 || 0 || 0 || ½ || 1 ||  || 1½ || 2197 || 12
|}

 WGM Viktorija Čmilytė (2433) won Reserve Group Swiss-system tournament with the score 7/9 and performance rating 2616.

References

Tata Steel Chess Tournament
2001 in chess
2001 in Dutch sport